Cheshmeh Dozdak-e Sofla (also Romanized as Cheshmeh Dozdak-e Soflá; also known as Cheshmeh Dozdak-e Pā’īn) is a village in Chenar Rural District, Kabgian District, Dana County, Kohgiluyeh and Boyer-Ahmad Province, Iran. At the 2006 census, its population was 133, in 30 families.

References 

Populated places in Dana County